Qalhata was a Nubian queen dated to the Twenty-fifth Dynasty of Egypt.

Qalhata was a daughter of King Piye and a queen consort to her brother Shabaka. She is known from the Dream Stela of King Tantamani and from her pyramid in El-Kurru (Ku. 5).

Assyrian records state that King Tantamani was the son of Taharqa's sister. The tomb of Qalhata at El-Kurru contains texts that say she is a King's Mother, giving some evidence of the family relationships.

References

8th-century BC Egyptian women
Queens consort of the Twenty-fifth Dynasty of Egypt
8th-century BC Egyptian people